Cambodia participated in the 2002 Asian Games held in Busan, South Korea, from September 29 to October 14, 2002.

Athletics

Nepal competed in athletics.

Key
Note–Ranks given for track events are within the athlete's heat only
Q = Qualified for the next round
q = Qualified for the next round as a fastest loser or, in field events, by position without achieving the qualifying target
qR = Qualified to the next round by referee judgement
NR = National record
N/A = Round not applicable for the event
Bye = Athlete not required to compete in round

Track & road events
Men

Boxing

Cambodia participated in boxing.

Men

Swimming

Cambodia participated in swimming.

Men

Women

Taekwondo

Nepal participated in taekwondo.

Men

References

Nations at the 2002 Asian Games
2002
Asian Games